Robert Dickson (born 6 March 1998) is an Irish sailor. He is competing at the 2020 Summer Olympics in the 49er class together with Sean Waddilove. They were disqualified from two races because one of the trapeze harnesses used by the Irish pair (that of the helm) weighed 90 grams more than the maximum of 2 kg.

References

1998 births
Living people
Irish male sailors (sport)
Olympic sailors of Ireland
Sailors at the 2020 Summer Olympics – 49er